Gymnoscelis poecilimon is a moth in the family Geometridae. It was described by Louis Beethoven Prout in 1958. It is found in New Ireland.

References

Moths described in 1958
poecilimon